Skiptvet is a municipality in Viken county, Norway.  The administrative centre of the municipality is the village of Meieribyen.  Skiptvet was established as a municipality on 1 January 1838 (see formannskapsdistrikt).

General information

Name
The municipality (originally the parish) is named after the old Skiptvet farm (Old Norse: Skipþveit and/or Skygþveit) because the first church was built here. The meaning of the first element(s) is not known, and the last element is þveit 'clearing in the woods'.  Prior to 1889, the name was written Skibtvet.

Coat-of-arms
The coat-of-arms is from modern times.  They were granted on 27 November 1981.  The arms show a silver dragon on a red background. The dragon is derived from a local legend, in which a dragon went to sleep in the local churchyard every morning. In the evening the dragon went back to the forest, where it had its lair.  A tarn near the church is still called Dragehullet meaning "the dragon's pit".

Notable people 
 Jens Christian Spidberg (1684 in Skiptvet - 1762) cartographer, theologian, priest and Bishop of the Diocese of Agder og Telemark

References

External links

Municipal fact sheet from Statistics Norway

 
Municipalities of Østfold
Municipalities of Viken (county)
Villages in Østfold